Dioscorea communis or Tamus communis is a species of flowering plant in the yam family Dioscoreaceae and is commonly known as black bryony, lady's-seal or black bindweed.

Description
It is a climbing herbaceous plant growing to 2–4 m tall, with stems that twine anticlockwise. The leaves are spirally arranged, heart-shaped, up to 10 cm long and 8 cm broad, with a petiole up to 5 cm long. It is dioecious, with separate male and female plants. The flowers are individually inconspicuous, greenish-yellow, 3–6 mm diameter, with six petals; the male flowers produced in slender 5–10 cm racemes, the female flowers in shorter clusters. The fruit is a bright red berry, 1 cm diameter. Its fairly large tuber is, like the rest of the plant, poisonous.

Distribution
Dioscorea communis is native and widespread throughout southern and central Europe, northwest Africa and western Asia, from Ireland to the Canary Islands, east to Iran and Crimea.

Habitat
Dioscorea communis is a typical plant of the forest understory, from the sea to the mountains, usually in dense woods, but it can also be found in meadows and hedges.

Uses 
All components of the black bryony plant, including the tubers, are poisonous due to saponin content, so it is not typically used internally; however, it has been used as a poultice for bruises and inflamed joints. It has been suggested that black bryony be used topically with caution, due to a tendency for the plant to cause painful blisters.

Studies have isolated calcium oxalate deposits and histamines in the berry juice and rhizomes, which may contribute to skin irritation and contact dermatitis associated with black bryony.

Black Bryony is highly poisonous and should not be ingested at all at least when raw. When cooked, young shoots are commonly eaten in southern France, Greece, Spain, Portugal, Italy and Croatia.

Chemistry 
The rhizome contains phenanthrenes (7-hydroxy-2,3,4,8-tetramethoxyphenanthrene, 2,3,4-trimethoxy-7,8-methylenedioxyphenanthrene, 3-hydroxy-2,4,-dimethoxy-7,8-methylenedioxyphenanthrene, 2-hydroxy-3,5,7-trimethoxyphenanthrene and 2-hydroxy-3,5,7-trimethoxy-9,10-dihydrophenanthrene).

Gallery

References

External links

communis
Medicinal plants of Africa
Medicinal plants of Asia
Medicinal plants of Europe
Plants described in 1753
Taxa named by Carl Linnaeus
Flora of Lebanon